The 22nd United States Congress was a meeting of the legislative branch of the United States federal government, consisting of the United States Senate and the United States House of Representatives. It met in Washington, D.C. from March 4, 1831, to March 4, 1833, during the third and fourth years of Andrew Jackson's presidency. The apportionment of seats in the House of Representatives was based on the 1820 United States census. Both chambers had a Jacksonian majority.

Major events

 December 28, 1832: Vice President John C. Calhoun resigned. The first Vice President of the United States to do so.
 Nullification Crisis

Major legislation

 July 14, 1832: Tariff of 1832, ch. 227, 
 March 2, 1833: Tariff of 1833 (Compromise Tariff), ch. 55, 
 March 2, 1833: Force Bill, ch. 57,

Party summary
The count below identifies party affiliations at the beginning of the first session of this congress. Changes resulting from subsequent replacements are shown below in the "Changes in membership" section.

Senate

House of Representatives

Leadership

Senate 
 President: John C. Calhoun (J), resigned December 28, 1832; thereafter vacant.
 President pro tempore: Samuel Smith (J), first elected December 5, 1831
 Littleton W. Tazewell (J), elected July 9, 1832
 Hugh Lawson White (J), elected December 3, 1832

House of Representatives 
 Speaker:  Andrew Stevenson (J)

Members
This list is arranged by chamber, then by state. Senators are listed in order of seniority, and representatives are listed by district.

Skip to House of Representatives, below

Senate
Senators were elected by the state legislatures every two years, with one-third beginning new six-year terms with each Congress. Preceding the names in the list below are Senate class numbers, which indicate the cycle of their election. In this Congress, Class 1 meant their term ended with this Congress, requiring re-election in 1832; Class 2 meant their term began in the last Congress, requiring re-election in 1834; and Class 3 meant their term began in this Congress, requiring re-election in 1836.

Alabama 
 2. William R. King (J)
 3. Gabriel Moore (J)

Connecticut 
 1. Samuel A. Foot (NR)
 3. Gideon Tomlinson (NR)

Delaware 
 1. Arnold Naudain (NR)
 2. John M. Clayton (NR)

Georgia 
 2. George M. Troup (J)
 3. John Forsyth (J)

Illinois 
 2. John M. Robinson (J)
 3. Elias K. Kane (J)

Indiana 
 1. Robert Hanna (NR), from August 19, 1831 - January 3, 1832
 John Tipton (J), from January 3, 1832
 3. William Hendricks (NR)

Kentucky 
 2. George M. Bibb (J)
 3. Henry Clay (NR), from November 10, 1831

Louisiana 
 2. Edward Livingston (J), until May 24, 1831
 George A. Waggaman (NR), from November 15, 1831
 3. Josiah S. Johnston (NR)

Maine 
 1. John Holmes (NR)
 2. Peleg Sprague (NR)

Maryland 
 1. Samuel Smith (J)
 3. Ezekiel F. Chambers (NR)

Massachusetts 
 1. Daniel Webster (NR)
 2. Nathaniel Silsbee (NR)

Mississippi 
 1. Powhatan Ellis (J), until July 16, 1832
 John Black (J), from November 12, 1832
 2. George Poindexter (NR)

Missouri 
 1. Thomas H. Benton (J)
 3. Alexander Buckner (J)

New Hampshire 
 2. Samuel Bell (NR)
 3. Isaac Hill (J)

New Jersey 
 1. Mahlon Dickerson (J)
 2. Theodore Frelinghuysen (NR)

New York 
 1. Charles E. Dudley (J)
 3. William L. Marcy (J), until January 1, 1833
 Silas Wright Jr. (J), from January 4, 1833

North Carolina 
 2. Bedford Brown (J)
 3. Willie P. Mangum (J)

Ohio 
 1. Benjamin Ruggles (NR)
 3. Thomas Ewing (NR)

Pennsylvania 
 1. Isaac D. Barnard (J), until December 6, 1831
 George M. Dallas (J), from December 13, 1831
 3. William Wilkins (J)

Rhode Island 
 1. Asher Robbins (NR)
 2. Nehemiah R. Knight (NR)

South Carolina 
 2. Robert Y. Hayne (N), until December 3, 1832
 John C. Calhoun (N), from December 29, 1832
 3. Stephen D. Miller (N), until March 2, 1833, vacant for remainder of term

Tennessee 
 1. Felix Grundy (J)
 2. Hugh Lawson White (J)

Vermont 
 1. Horatio Seymour (NR)
 3. Samuel Prentiss (NR)

Virginia 
 1. John Tyler (J)
 2. Littleton W. Tazewell (J), until July 16, 1832
 William C. Rives (J), from December 10, 1832

House of Representatives
The names of members of the House of Representatives are preceded by their district numbers.

Alabama 
 . Clement C. Clay (J)
 . Samuel W. Mardis (J)
 . Dixon H. Lewis (J)

Connecticut 
All representatives were elected statewide on a general ticket.
 . Noyes Barber (NR)
 . William W. Ellsworth (NR)
 . Jabez W. Huntington (NR)
 . Ralph I. Ingersoll (NR)
 . William L. Storrs (NR)
 . Ebenezer Young (NR)

Delaware 
 . John J. Milligan (NR)

Georgia 
All representatives were elected statewide on a general ticket.
 . Thomas F. Foster (J)
 . Henry G. Lamar (J)
 . Wilson Lumpkin (J), until ????, 1831
 Augustin S. Clayton (J), from January 21, 1832
 . Daniel Newnan (J)
 . Wiley Thompson (J)
 . James M. Wayne (J)
 . Richard Henry Wilde (J)

Illinois 
 . Joseph Duncan (J)

Indiana 
 . Ratliff Boon (J)
 . John Carr (J)
 . Johnathan McCarty (J)

Kentucky 
 . Henry Daniel (J)
 . Thomas A. Marshall (NR)
 . Chilton Allan (NR)
 . Robert P. Letcher (NR)
 . Richard M. Johnson (J)
 . Joseph Lecompte (J)
 . John Adair (J)
 . Nathan Gaither (J)
 . Charles A. Wickliffe (J)
 . Christopher Tompkins (NR)
 . Albert G. Hawes (J)
 . Chittenden Lyon (J)

Louisiana 
 . Edward D. White (NR)
 . Philemon Thomas (J)
 . Henry A. Bullard (NR)

Maine 
 . Rufus McIntire (J)
 . John Anderson (J)
 . Edward Kavanagh (J)
 . George Evans (NR)
 . Cornelius Holland (J)
 . Leonard Jarvis (J)
 . James Bates (J)

Maryland 
The 5th district was a plural district with two representatives.
 . Daniel Jenifer (NR)
 . Benedict J. Semmes (NR)
 . George C. Washington (NR)
 . Francis Thomas (J)
 . Benjamin C. Howard (J)
 . John T. H. Worthington (J)
 . George E. Mitchell (J), until June 28, 1832
 Charles S. Sewall (J), from October 1, 1832
 . John L. Kerr (NR)
 . John S. Spence (NR)

Massachusetts 
 . Nathan Appleton (NR)
 . Rufus Choate (NR)
 . Jeremiah Nelson (NR)
 . Edward Everett (NR)
 . John Davis (NR)
 . Joseph G. Kendall (NR)
 . George J. Grennell Jr. (NR)
 . Isaac C. Bates (NR)
 . George N. Briggs (NR)
 . Henry A. S. Dearborn (NR)
 . John Quincy Adams (NR)
 . James L. Hodges (NR)
 . John Reed Jr. (NR)

Mississippi 
 . Franklin E. Plummer (J)

Missouri 
 . Spencer D. Pettis (J), until August 28, 1831
 William H. Ashley (J), from October 31, 1831

New Hampshire 
All representatives were elected statewide on a general ticket.
 . John Brodhead (J)
 . Thomas Chandler (J)
 . Joseph Hammons (J)
 . Joseph M. Harper (J)
 . Henry Hubbard (J)
 . John W. Weeks (J)

New Jersey 
All representatives were elected statewide on a general ticket.
 . Lewis Condict (NR)
 . Silas Condit (NR)
 . Richard M. Cooper (NR)
 . Thomas H. Hughes (NR)
 . James F. Randolph (NR)
 . Isaac Southard (NR)

New York 
There were three plural districts, the 20th & 26th had two representatives each, the 3rd had three representatives.
 . James Lent (J), until February 22, 1833, vacant thereafter
 . John T. Bergen (J)
 . Churchill C. Cambreleng (J)
 . Gulian C. Verplanck (J)
 . Campbell P. White (J)
 . Aaron Ward (J)
 . Edmund H. Pendleton (NR)
 . Samuel J. Wilkin (NR)
 . John C. Brodhead (J)
 . John King (J)
 . Job Pierson (J)
 . Gerrit Y. Lansing (J)
 . Erastus Root (J)
 . Joseph Bouck (J)
 . William G. Angel (J)
 . Samuel Beardsley (J)
 . Michael Hoffman (J)
 . Nathan Soule (J)
 . John W. Taylor (NR)
 . Nathaniel Pitcher (J)
 . William Hogan (J)
 . Charles Dayan (J)
 . Daniel Wardwell (J)
 . John A. Collier (Anti-M)
 . Edward C. Reed (J)
 . Freeborn G. Jewett (J)
 . Ulysses F. Doubleday (J)
 . Gamaliel H. Barstow (Anti-M)
 . William Babcock (Anti-M)
 . John Dickson (Anti-M)
 . Frederick Whittlesey (Anti-M)
 . Grattan H. Wheeler (Anti-M)
 . Phineas L. Tracy (Anti-M)
 . Bates Cooke (Anti-M)

North Carolina 
 . William B. Shepard (NR)
 . John Branch (J), from May 12, 1831
 . Thomas H. Hall (J)
 . Jesse Speight (J)
 . James I. McKay (J)
 . Robert Potter (J), until November ????, 1831
 Micajah T. Hawkins (J), from December 15, 1831
 . Lauchlin Bethune (J)
 . Daniel L. Barringer (J)
 . Augustine H. Shepperd (J)
 . Abraham Rencher (J)
 . Henry W. Connor (J)
 . Samuel P. Carson (J)
 . Lewis Williams (NR)

Ohio 
 . James Findlay (J)
 . Thomas Corwin (NR)
 . Joseph H. Crane (NR)
 . Joseph Vance (NR)
 . William Russell (J)
 . William Creighton Jr. (NR)
 . Samuel F. Vinton (NR)
 . William Stanbery (NR)
 . William W. Irvin (J)
 . William S. Kennon Sr. (J)
 . Humphrey H. Leavitt (J)
 . John Thomson (J)
 . Elisha Whittlesey (NR)
 . Eleutheros Cooke (NR)

Pennsylvania 
There were six plural districts, the 7th, 8th, 11th & 16th had two representatives each, the 4th & 9th had three representatives each.
 . Joel B. Sutherland (J)
 . Henry Horn (J)
 . John G. Watmough (NR)
 . Joshua Evans Jr. (J)
 . William Hiester (Anti-M)
 . David Potts Jr. (Anti-M)
 . Joel K. Mann (J)
 . John C. Bucher (J)
 . Henry King (J)
 . Henry A. P. Muhlenberg (J)
 . Peter Ihrie Jr. (J)
 . Samuel A. Smith (J)
 . Lewis Dewart (J)
 . James Ford (J)
 . Philander Stephens (J)
 . Adam King (J)
 . Thomas H. Crawford (J)
 . William Ramsey (J), until September 29, 1831
 Robert McCoy (J), from November 22, 1831
 . Robert Allison (Anti-M)
 . George Burd (NR)
 . Andrew Stewart (Anti-M)
 . Thomas M.T. McKennan (Anti-M)
 . Harmar Denny (Anti-M)
 . John Gilmore (J)
 . Richard Coulter (J)
 . John Banks (Anti-M)

Rhode Island 
Both representatives were elected statewide on a general ticket.
 . Tristam Burges (NR)
 . Dutee J. Pearce (NR)

South Carolina 
 . William Drayton (J)
 . Robert W. Barnwell (N)
 . Thomas R. Mitchell (J)
 . John Myers Felder (J)
 . George McDuffie (N)
 . Warren R. Davis (N)
 . William T. Nuckolls (J)
 . James Blair (J)
 . John K. Griffin (N)

Tennessee 
 . John Blair (J)
 . Thomas D. Arnold (NR)
 . James I. Standifer (J)
 . Jacob C. Isacks (J)
 . William Hall (J)
 . James K. Polk (J)
 . John Bell (J)
 . Cave Johnson (J)
 . William Fitzgerald (J)

Vermont 
 . Jonathan Hunt (NR), until May 15, 1832
 Hiland Hall (NR), from January 1, 1833
 . Rollin C. Mallary (NR), until April 15, 1831
 William Slade (Anti-M), from November 1, 1831
 . Horace Everett (NR)
 . Heman Allen (NR)
 . William Cahoon (Anti-M)

Virginia 
 . Thomas Newton Jr. (NR)
 . John Y. Mason (J)
 . William S. Archer (J)
 . Mark Alexander (J)
 . Thomas T. Bouldin (J)
 . Thomas Davenport (J)
 . Nathaniel H. Claiborne (J)
 . Richard Coke Jr. (J)
 . Andrew Stevenson (J)
 . William F. Gordon (J)
 . John M. Patton (J)
 . John J. Roane (J)
 . Joseph W. Chinn (J)
 . Charles F. Mercer (NR)
 . John S. Barbour (J)
 . William Armstrong (NR)
 . Robert Allen (J)
 . Philip Doddridge (NR), until November 19, 1832
 Joseph Johnson (J), from January 21, 1833
 . William McCoy (J)
 . Robert Craig (J)
 . Lewis Maxwell (NR)
 . Charles C. Johnston (J), until June 17, 1832
 Joseph Draper (J), from December 6, 1832

Non-voting members
 . Ambrose H. Sevier (J)
 . Joseph M. White
 . Austin E. Wing

Changes in membership
These counts reflect changes from the beginning of the first session of this Congress.

Senate 

 Replacements: 7
 Jacksonians: no net change
 National Republicans: no net change
 Nullifiers: no net change
 Deaths: 0
 Resignations: 7
 Interim appointments: 1
 Total seats with changes: 9

|-
| Indiana(1)
| Vacant
| style="font-size:80%" | James Noble had died February 26, 1831, in the previous Congress.Successor appointed August 19, 1831.
|  | Robert Hanna (NR)
| Installed August 19, 1831

|-
| Kentucky(3)
| Vacant
| style="font-size:80%" | Legislature elected late November 10, 1831.
|  | Henry Clay (NR)
| Installed November 10, 1831

|-
| Louisiana(2)
|  | Edward Livingston (J)
| style="font-size:80%" | Resigned May 24, 1831, after being appointed U.S. Secretary of State.Successor elected November 15, 1831.
|  | George A. Waggaman (NR)
| Installed November 15, 1831

|-
| Pennsylvania(1)
|  | Isaac D. Barnard (J)
| style="font-size:80%" | Resigned December 6, 1831, due to ill health.Successor elected December 13, 1831.
|  | George M. Dallas (J)
| Installed December 13, 1831

|-
| Indiana(1)
|  | Robert Hanna (NR)
| style="font-size:80%" | Appointee retired when elected successor qualified.Successor elected January 3, 1832.
|  | John Tipton (J)
| Installed January 3, 1832

|-
| Mississippi(1)
|  | Powhatan Ellis (J)
| style="font-size:80%" | Resigned July 16, 1832, after being appointed U.S. District Judge.Successor appointed November 12, 1832, to finish the term.
|  | John Black (J)
| Installed November 12, 1832

|-
| Virginia(2)
|  | Littleton Waller Tazewell (J)
| style="font-size:80%" | Resigned July 16, 1832.Successor elected December 10, 1832.
|  | William C. Rives (J)
| Installed December 10, 1832

|-
| South Carolina(2)
|  | Robert Y. Hayne (N)
| style="font-size:80%" | Resigned December 13, 1832, to become Governor of South Carolina.Successor elected December 29, 1832.
|  | John C. Calhoun (N)
| Installed December 29, 1832

|-
| New York(3)
|  | William L. Marcy (J)
| style="font-size:80%" | Resigned January 1, 1833, after becoming Governor of New York.Successor elected January 14, 1833.
|  | Silas Wright (J)
| Installed January 4, 1833

|-
| South Carolina(3)
|  | Stephen D. Miller (N)
| style="font-size:80%" | Resigned March 2, 1833, due to ill health.
| Vacant
| Not filled this term
|}

House of Representatives 

 Replacements: 9
 Jacksonians: 1-seat net gain
 National Republicans: 2-seat net loss
 Anti-Masonics: 1-seat net gain
 Deaths: 8
 Resignations: 2
 Contested election: 0
 Total seats with changes: 11

|-
| 
| Vacant
| Vacancy in term
|  | John Branch (J)
| Seated May 12, 1831

|-
| 
|  | Wilson Lumpkin (J)
| Resigned some time in 1831 before the convening of Congress
|  | Augustin S. Clayton (J)
| Seated January 21, 1832

|-
| 
|  | Rollin C. Mallary (NR)
| Died April 15, 1831
|  | William Slade (AM)
| Seated November 1, 1831

|-
| 
|  | Spencer D. Pettis (NR)
| Died August 28, 1831
|  | William H. Ashley (NR)
| Seated October 31, 1831
|-
| 
|  | William Ramsey (J)
| Died September 29, 1831
|  | Robert McCoy (J)
| Seated November 22, 1831

|-
| 
|  | Robert Potter (J)
| Resigned November ????, 1831
|  | Micajah T. Hawkins (J)
| Seated December 15, 1831

|-
| 
|  | Jonathan Hunt (NR)
| Died May 15, 1832.A special election was held and a new member elected January 1, 1833 on the fourth ballot.
|  | Hiland Hall (NR)
| Seated January 21, 1833

|-
| 
|  | Charles C. Johnston (J)
| Died June 17, 1832
|  | Joseph Draper (J)
| Seated December 6, 1832

|-
| 
|  | George E. Mitchell (J)
| Died June 28, 1832
|  | Charles S. Sewall (J)
| Seated October 1, 1832

|-
| 
|  | Philip Doddridge (NR)
| Died November 19, 1832
|  | Joseph Johnson (J)
| Seated January 21, 1833

|-
| 
|  | James Lent (J)
| Died February 22, 1833
| Vacant
| Not filled this Congress

|}

Committees
Lists of committees and their party leaders.

Senate

 Accounts of James Monroe (Select)
 Agriculture (Chairman: Horatio Seymour)
 Amending the Constitution on the Election of the President and Vice President (Select)
 Audit and Control the Contingent Expenses of the Senate (Chairman: Nehemiah Knight)
 Claims (Chairman: Benjamin Ruggles)
 Commerce (Chairman: John Forsyth then William R. King)
 Distributing Public Revenue Among the States (Select)
 District of Columbia (Chairman: Ezekiel F. Chambers)
 Dueling (Select)
 Engrossed Bills (Chairman: John M. Robinson then Asher Robbins)
 Finance (Chairman: Samuel Smith then John Forsyth)
 Foreign Relations (Chairman: Littleton Tazewell then John Forsyth)
 French Spoilations (Select)
 Impeachment of James H. Peck (Select)
 Indian Affairs (Chairman: Hugh Lawson White then George M. Troup) 
 Judiciary (Chairman: William L. Marcy then William Wilkins) 
 Manufactures (Chairman: Mahlon Dickerson)
 Memorial of the Manufacturers Iron (Select)
 Mileage of Members of Congress (Select)
 Military Affairs (Chairman: Thomas Hart Benton)
 Militia (Chairman: Isaac Barnard)
 Naval Affairs (Chairman: Robert Y. Hayne)
 Nomination of Amos Kendall (Select)
 Pensions (Chairman: Samuel A. Foot)
 Post Office Department (Select)
 Post Office and Post Roads (Chairman: George M. Bibb)
 Private Land Claims (Chairman: Elias Kane)
 Public Lands (Chairman: William R. King then Elias Kane)
 Roads and Canals (Select) (Chairman: William Hendricks)
 Tariff Regulation (Select)
 Whole

House of Representatives

 Accounts (Chairman: N/A)
 Agriculture (Chairman: Erastus Root)
 American Colonization Society (Select)
 Claims (Chairman: N/A)
 Commerce (Chairman: N/A)
 District of Columbia (Chairman: N/A)
 Elections (Chairman: N/A)
 Establishing an Assay Office in the Gold Region (Select)
 Expenditures in the Navy Department (Chairman: N/A)
 Expenditures in the Post Office Department (Chairman: N/A)
 Expenditures in the State Department (Chairman: N/A)
 Expenditures in the Treasury Department (Chairman: N/A)
 Expenditures in the War Department (Chairman: N/A)
 Expenditures on Public Buildings (Chairman: N/A)
 Foreign Affairs (Chairman: William S. Archer)
 Indian Affairs (Chairman: N/A)
 Judiciary (Chairman: Warren R. Davis then John Bell)
 Manufactures (Chairman: Michael Hoffman)
 Military Affairs (Chairman: N/A)
 Naval Affairs (Chairman: N/A)
 Post Office and Post Roads (Chairman: Richard M. Johnson then Henry W. Connor)
 Public Expenditures (Chairman: N/A)
 Public Lands (Chairman: Charles A. Wickliffe)
 Revisal and Unfinished Business (Chairman: N/A)
 Revolutionary Claims (Chairman: N/A)
 Revolutionary Pensions (Chairman: N/A)
 Rules (Select)
 Standards of Official Conduct (Chairman: N/A)
 Territories (Chairman: N/A)
 Ways and Means (Chairman: George McDuffie then Gulian C. Verplanck)
 Whole

Joint committees

 Enrolled Bills
 The Library

Employees 
 Librarian of Congress: John Silva Meehan

Senate 
 Chaplain: Henry V. Johns (Episcopal), until December 19, 1831
 John P. Durbin (Methodist), elected December 19, 1831
 Charles C. Pise (Roman Catholic), elected December 11, 1832
 Secretary: Walter Lowrie
 Sergeant at Arms: Mountjoy Bayly

House of Representatives 
 Chaplain: Ralph R. Gurley (Presbyterian), until December 13, 1831
 Reuben Post (Presbyterian) elected December 13, 1831
 William Hammett (Presbyterian), elected December 12, 1832
 Clerk: Matthew St. Clair Clarke
 Doorkeeper: Overton Carr, elected December 5, 1831
 Reading Clerks: 
 Sergeant at Arms: John O. Dunn

See also 
 1830 United States elections (elections leading to this Congress)
 1830–31 United States Senate elections
 1830–31 United States House of Representatives elections
 1832 United States elections (elections during this Congress, leading to the next Congress)
 1832 United States presidential election
 1832–33 United States Senate elections
 1832–33 United States House of Representatives elections

Notes

References

External links
 Statutes at Large, 1789-1875
 Senate Journal, First Forty-three Sessions of Congress
 House Journal, First Forty-three Sessions of Congress
 Biographical Directory of the U.S. Congress
 U.S. House of Representatives: House History
 U.S. Senate: Statistics and Lists